James W. Keyes is currently the chairman of Wild Oats Marketing LLC. Previously, Keyes served as chief executive officer of 7-Eleven, Inc., and chairman and CEO of Blockbuster, Inc.

Education
Keyes graduated cum laude and Phi Beta Kappa with a bachelor's degree from the College of the Holy Cross. He also obtained an MBA from Columbia Business School in 1980.

Career
From 1980 to 1985, Keyes worked for the Gulf Oil Corporation (now called Chevron). Keyes joined CITGO Petroleum in 1985, which was then a subsidiary of 7-Eleven, Inc. In May 1996, he became the chief financial officer of 7-Eleven Inc. In 1998, he became chief operating officer of the company.

In 2000, Keyes was appointed president and CEO of 7-Eleven, a position he held until 2005. He retired from 7-Eleven when it was sold to Seven & I Holdings Co. As president and CEO, Keyes implemented new retail systems technology that improved product assortment decisions.

Keyes served as chairman and chief executive officer of Blockbuster, Inc., from 2007 to 2011, being brought into the company by investor and Blockbuster board member Carl Icahn. In 2007, Keyes helped Blockbuster acquire Movielink, a streaming video service, to compete with Netflix and Apple TV. Keyes chose to shift focus from online to the stores and tried to improve the company's finances through moves such as restoring late fees. Keyes attributed its struggles to having to both grow the company to please Icahn and to pay back its $1 billion in debt in 2009, which made refinancing very difficult owing to the financial crisis. Keyes led the company after it filed for bankruptcy and facilitated a sale to Dish Network.

Keyes is founder of the Education is Freedom foundation, which provides college scholarships for hard-working young students.   
 
Keyes has been a director of Murphy USA Inc. since August 2013.

Keyes serves on numerous civic boards, including the American Red Cross national board of governors, the Cooper Institute, and the Dallas Education Foundation.

Awards

In 2005, Keyes received the Horatio Alger Award, which is given to leaders in the community who exemplify "honesty, hard work, self reliance and perseverance". In 2008, he was awarded the Ellis Island Medal of Honor.

References 

American chief executives of food industry companies
Columbia Business School alumni
Living people
College of the Holy Cross alumni
American chief financial officers
American chief operating officers
American retail chief executives
Year of birth missing (living people)